Festuca minutiflora, the smallflower fescue, is a species of grass in the family Poaceae. It is native to Alaska, Alberta, Arizona, British Columbia, California, Colorado, Idaho, Montana, Nevada, New Mexico, Oregon, Utah, Wyoming, and the Yukon. Festuca minutiflora was first published in 1905 by Per Axel Rydberg.

Habitat 
It is perennial and mainly grows in temperate biomes.

References

minutiflora